Cédric Mensah (born 6 March 1989) is a French-born Togolese professional footballer who plays as a goalkeeper for Stade Poitevin. He has been a member of the Togo national team.

Career
Born in Marseille, Mensah played in Marseille for the lower division clubs JS Arménienne Saint-Antoine, SA Saint-Antoine, S.O. Caillolais and UST Marseille. With 14 years he moved to FC Girondins de Bordeaux and in the 2006–07 season he was as reserve (back-up) keeper for one match. He left than Bordeaux in July 2007, signed a contract for OSC Lille played here in the reserve and on 3 August 2008 signed a contract with Paris FC. He played only two games in his first season for Paris FC. The football goalkeeper terminated his contract with Paris FC on 15 October 2009. After one year without a club signed for Olympique de Marseille and played since them in the reserve team.

International career
Mensah is member of the Togo national football team, he played his debut for Togo on 1 June 2008 against Zambia national football team.

References

External links

Foot National Stats

1989 births
Living people
Footballers from Marseille
French sportspeople of Togolese descent
Citizens of Togo through descent
Association football goalkeepers
Togolese footballers
French footballers
Togo international footballers
Paris FC players
SR Colmar players
Le Mans FC players
Stade Lavallois players
Jura Sud Foot players
Stade Poitevin FC players
Championnat National players
2017 Africa Cup of Nations players